Tree rat or tree-rat may refer to the following rodents:

Squirrels (family Sciuridae), occurring worldwide;
Black rat (Rattus rattus), occurring worldwide;
Brachytarsomys (several species), from Madagascar;
Callistomys (the painted tree-rat), from Brazil;
Carpomys, from the Philippines;
Chiromyscus (Fea's tree rat), from southeastern Asia;
Conilurus, from Australia and southern New Guinea;
Diplomys labilis, the rufous tree rat, from Panama, Colombia, and Ecuador;
Diplothrix, the Ryukyus Islands tree rat, from the Ryukyu Islands;
Echimys, from Amazonia;
Kadarsanomys, Sody's tree rat, from Java;
Lenothrix, the gray tree rat, from Southeast Asia;
Lonchothrix, the tuft-tailed spiny tree rat, from Brazil;
Macaques, from SE Asia
Makalata, from Amazonia;
Mesembriomys, from Australia;
Mesomys, from Amazonia;
Niviventer langbianis, the dark-tailed tree rat, from Southeast Asia;
Papagomys armandvillei, the Flores giant tree rat, from Flores;
Pattonomys, from South America;
Phyllomys, from the Atlantic Forest of eastern South America;
Pithecheir, from Southeast Asia;
Santamartamys, the red crested tree rat, from Colombia;
Thallomys nigricauda, the black-tailed tree rat, from southwestern Africa;
Toromys, the giant tree rat, from Brazil;
Xenuromys, the mimic tree-rat, from New Guinea.

Animal common name disambiguation pages